Óscar David Álvarez Ortega (born 29 March 1983) is a Colombian professional golfer who currently plays on PGA Tour Latinoamérica.

Amateur career
Early in his career, Álvarez was named Colombia's Amateur Golfer of the Year in 2000. As an amateur, he qualified for the 2004 U.S. Open at Shinnecock Hills Golf Club but failed to make the cut after shooting rounds of 78 and 80. Following this he qualified for the 2004 U.S. Amateur.

At college level, he played at Brigham Young University and was a two time All-American before graduating in 2006.

Professional career
After graduating from the university, Álvarez turned professional in 2006 and joined the Tour de las Américas while also playing on the Colombian Tour. From 2007 he also played on the NGA Hooters Tour. In April 2009, Álvarez won his first professional tournament at the Georgia Sports Orthopedic Specialists Classic on the NGA Hooters Tour. During 2009, he also won the Abierto del Club Campestre de Medellín on the Colombian Tour and in July won his first title on the Tour de las Américas at the 51st Abierto Internacional Ciudad de Bucaramanga A fourth win of the 2009 season came at the XI Abierto de Golf del Serrezuela Country Club in November on the Colombian Tour.

In 2010, Álvarez had continued success on the Tour de las Américas winning the VI Abierto Internacional Eje Cafetero in July, in doing so he became only the fourth Colombian golfer to win at least twice on the tour after Jesús Amaya, Ángel Romero and Eduardo Herrera. His third and final win on the Tour de las Américas was also his biggest win at the 2011 Aberto do Brasil.

In 2012 following the cessation of the Tour de las Américas, Álvarez became a member of the newly formed PGA Tour Latinoamérica but did not enjoy his previous level of success finishing 39th on the inaugural seasons Order of Merit. In 2013, he was again winless on PGA Tour Latinoamérica but had success on the Colombian Tour picked up his third victory on the tour at the 2013 XV Abierto de Golf del Club El Rancho.

In 2014, Álvarez picked up his fourth win on the Colombian Tour at the 2014 54th Copa Sura. Following this he won his first title on PGA Tour Latinoamérica at the 2014 TransAmerican Power Products CRV Mexico Open

Professional wins (9)

PGA Tour Latinoamérica wins (1)

Tour de las Américas wins (3)

NGA Hooters Tour wins (1)

Colombian Tour wins (4)
 2009 Abierto del Club Campestre de Medellín, Abierto de Golf del Serrezuela Country Club
 2013 Abierto de Golf del Club El Rancho
 2014 Copa Sura

Results in major championships

CUT = missed the half-way cut
Note: Álvarez only played in the U.S. Open.

Team appearances
Amateur
Eisenhower Trophy (representing Colombia): 2000

References

External links
 
 

Colombian male golfers
PGA Tour Latinoamérica golfers
BYU Cougars men's golfers
Sportspeople from Medellín
1983 births
Living people